Friday is the day of the week between Thursday and Saturday. In countries that adopt the traditional "Sunday-first" convention, it is the sixth day of the week. In countries adopting the ISO-defined "Monday-first" convention, it is the fifth day of the week. 

In most Western countries, Friday is the fifth and final day of the working week. In some other countries, Friday is the first day of the weekend, with Saturday the second. 
In Israel, Friday is the sixth day of the week. In Iran, Friday is the last day of the weekend, with Saturday as the first day of the working week. Bahrain, the United Arab Emirates (UAE), Saudi Arabia and Kuwait also followed this convention until they changed to a Friday–Saturday weekend on September 1, 2006, in Bahrain and the UAE, and a year later in Kuwait. The UAE changed its weekend from Friday-Saturday to Saturday-Sunday on January 1, 2022.

Etymology

The name Friday comes from the Old English , meaning the "day of Frig", a result of an old convention associating the Germanic goddess Frigg with the Roman goddess Venus, with whom the day is associated in many different cultures.

The expected cognate name in Old Norse would be . The distinction between Freyja and Frigg in some Germanic mythologies is contested.

An exception is Portuguese, also a Romance language, which uses the word , meaning "sixth day of liturgical celebration", derived from the Latin  used in religious texts where it was not allowed to consecrate days to pagan gods. Another exception among the Romance languages is also Sardinian, in which the word  is derived from Latin . This name had been given by the Jewish community exiled to the island in order to designate the food specifically prepared for Shabbat eve.

In languages of Islamic countries outside the Arab world, the word for Friday is commonly a derivation of this: (Malay Jumaat  or  Jumat , Turkish , Persian/Urdu).

In modern Greek, four of the words for the week-days are derived from ordinals. Like Saturday and Sunday, Friday is named for its liturgical significance as the day of preparation before Sabbath, which was inherited by Greek Christian Orthodox culture from Jewish practices.

Friday was formerly a Christian fast day; this is the origin of the Irish , Scottish Gaelic , Manx  and Icelandic , all meaning "fast day".

In both biblical and modern Hebrew, Friday is   meaning "the sixth day."

In Tamil, the word for Friday is velli, also a name for Venus; and in Malayalam it is velliyalca. 

In Japanese,  is formed from the words  meaning Venus (lit. gold + planet) and  meaning day (of the week).

In the Nahuatl language, Friday is  meaning "day of Quetzalcoatl".

Most Slavic languages call Friday the "fifth (day)": Belarusian  – , Bulgarian  – , Czech , Polish , Russian  – , Serbo-Croatian  – , Slovak , Slovene , and Ukrainian  – . The Hungarian word  is a loan from Pannonian dialect of Slavic language. The n in  suggests an early adoption from Slavic, when many Slavic dialects still had nasal vowels. In modern Slavic languages only Polish retained nasal vowels.

Folklore
Friday is considered unlucky in some cultures.  This is particularly so in maritime circles; perhaps the most enduring sailing superstition is that it is unlucky to begin a voyage on a Friday.  In the 19th century, Admiral William Henry Smyth described Friday in his nautical lexicon The Sailor's Word-Book as:

( means "unlucky day".)

In modern times, Friday the 13th is considered to be especially unlucky, due to the conjunction of Friday with the unlucky number thirteen. Such a Friday may be called a "Black Friday".

However, this superstition is not universal, notably in Scottish Gaelic culture:

In astrology
In astrology, Friday is connected with the planet Venus and is symbolized by that planet's symbol ♀. Friday is also associated with the astrological signs Libra and Taurus.

Religious observances

Christianity

In Christianity, Good Friday is the Friday before Easter. It commemorates the crucifixion of Jesus. As such, adherents of many Christian denominations including the Roman Catholic, Eastern Orthodox, Methodist and Anglican traditions, observe the Friday Fast, which traditionally includes abstinence from meat, lacticinia, and alcohol on Fridays of the year.

Traditionally, Roman Catholics were obliged to refrain from eating the meat of warm-blooded animals on Fridays, although fish was allowed.  The Filet-O-Fish was invented in 1962 by Lou Groen, a McDonald's franchise owner in Cincinnati, Ohio, in response to falling hamburger sales on Fridays resulting from the Roman Catholic practice of abstaining from meat on Fridays.

In the present day, episcopal conferences are now authorized to allow some other form of penance to replace abstinence from meat. The 1983 Code of Canon Law states:
Canon 1250. The days and times of penance for the universal Church are each Friday of the whole year and the season of Lent.
Canon 1251. Abstinence from meat, or from some other food as determined by the Episcopal Conference, is to be observed on all Fridays, unless a solemnity should fall on a Friday. Abstinence and fasting are to be observed on Ash Wednesday and Good Friday.
Canon 1253. The Episcopal Conference can determine more particular ways in which fasting and abstinence are to be observed. In place of abstinence or fasting it can substitute, in whole or in part, other forms of penance, especially works of charity and exercises of piety.

The Book of Common Prayer prescribes weekly Friday fasting and abstinence from meat for all Anglicans.

In Methodism, the Directions Given to Band Societies (25 December 1744) mandate for all Methodists fasting and abstinence from meat on all Fridays of the year.

The Eastern Orthodox Church continues to observe Fridays (as well as Wednesdays) as fast days throughout the year (with the exception of several fast-free periods during the year). Fasting on Fridays entails abstinence from meat or meat products (i.e., quadrupeds), poultry, and dairy products (as well as fish). Unless a feast day occurs on a Friday, the Orthodox also abstain from using oil in their cooking and from alcoholic beverages (there is some debate over whether abstention from oil involves all cooking oil or only olive oil). On particularly important feast days, fish may also be permitted. These include  (hymns to the Mother of God) which are chanted on Wednesdays and Fridays called  ("Cross-"). The dismissal at the end of services on Fridays begins with the words: "May Christ our true God, through the power of the precious and life-giving cross...."

Quakers traditionally referred to Friday as "Sixth Day," eschewing the pagan origins of the name. In Slavic countries, it is called "Fifth Day".

Hinduism
The day is named after the Shukracharya, son of Bhrigu and Kavyamata (Usana). In Hinduism, special observances are practiced for mother goddesses on Friday. Fridays are important for married ladies. They worship Goddesses on that day.

Islam

In Islam, Friday (from sun-down Thursday to sun-down Friday, simpler than midnight to midnight in a pre-clock age) is the day of communion, of praying together, often mistaken as the holy day of Muslims corresponding to Sunday in Christianity and Sabbath (Friday evening to Saturday evening) in Judaism and Sabbatarian Christianity; yet the seventh day is the holy day of contemplation and rest also for Muslims, as it is called – Al-sabt – السبت in Arabic - the Sabbath. Friday observance includes attendance at a mosque for congregation prayer or Salat AlJumu'ah. It is considered a day of peace and mercy (see Jumu'ah) as well as a day of rest.

According to some Islamic traditions, the day is stated to be the original holy day ordained by God, but that now Jews and Christians recognize the days after. In some Islamic countries, the week begins on Sunday and ends on Saturday, just like the Jewish week and the week in some Christian countries. The week begins on Saturday and ends on Friday in most other Islamic countries, such as Somalia, and Iran. Friday is also the day of rest in the Baháʼí Faith. In some Malaysian states, Friday is the first week-end day, with Saturday the second, to allow Muslims to perform their religious obligations on Friday. Sunday is the first working day of the week for governmental organizations.

Muslims are recommended not to fast on a Friday by itself (makruh, recommended against, but not haram, religiously forbidden), unless it is accompanied with fasting the day before (Thursday) or day after (Saturday), or it corresponds with days usually considered good for fasting (i.e. Day of Arafah or Ashura), or it falls within one's usual religious fasting habits (i.e. fasting every other day), then it's completely permissible.
Muslims believe Friday as "Syed-ul-Ayyam" meaning King of days. A narration in Sahih Muslim describes the importance of Friday as follows.

"Abu Huraira reported the Messenger of Allah (PBUH) as saying: The best day on which the sun has risen is Friday; on it, Adam was created. on it he was made to enter Paradise, on it he was expelled from it. And the last hour will take place on no day other than Friday. 
(Sahih Muslim Book 7, Hadith 27)”

The Quran also has a sura (chapter) called Al-Jumu'ah (The Friday).

Judaism
Jewish Sabbath begins at sunset on Friday and lasts until nightfall on Saturday. There is a Jewish custom to fast on the Friday of the week of Chukat.

Thailand
In Thailand, the color associated with Friday is blue (see Thai calendar).

Named days
Black Friday refers to any one of several historical disasters that happened on Fridays, and, in a general sense, to any Friday the thirteenth.
In the United States, Black Friday is also the nickname of the day after Thanksgiving, the first day of the traditional Christmas shopping season.
Casual Friday (also called Dress-down, Aloha or Country and Western Friday) is a relaxation of the formal dress code employed by some corporations for the last day of the working week.
Good Friday is the Friday before Easter in the Christian liturgical calendar. It commemorates the crucifixion of Jesus.

Other
 Greta Thunberg's School strike for climate usually occurs on Fridays, and the movement is also called Fridays for Future.
 Church of the Flying Spaghetti Monster celebrates every Friday as a holy day.

See also 
 ISO 8601

References

External links

 
5 Friday
Aphrodite